Sparganothoides licrosana is a species of moth of the family Tortricidae. It is found in Sinaloa, Mexico.

The length of the forewings is 11.6–12.1 mm for males and 10.8–11.9 mm for females. The ground colour of the forewings is brown to brownish orange, with a pattern of orange, brownish-orange, and/or reddish-brown scaling. The hindwings are yellowish grey, but greyer marginally.

The larvae have been reared on Quercus lobata.

Etymology
The species name refers to the protuberances of the head and is derived from Greek likros (meaning horn).

References

Moths described in 2009
Sparganothoides